The Society of Children's Book Writers and Illustrators (SCBWI) is a nonprofit, 501(c)3 organization that acts as a network for the exchange of knowledge between writers, illustrators, editors, publishers, agents, librarians, educators, booksellers and others involved with literature for young people.

The SCBWI has more than 22,000 members worldwide, in over 80 regional chapters, making it the largest children's writing organization in the world.

History
In 1971, the organization was founded as the Society of Children's Book Writers by a group of Los Angeles-based writers, including the group's President Stephen Mooser and Executive Director Lin Oliver.  Authors Judy Blume and Jane Yolen sat on the original board and continue to be involved today.

In October 1973, details were announced for the Golden Kite Award, the only children's literary award judged by a jury of peers.  Today, the awards are given annually to recognize excellence in children's literature in four categories: Fiction, Nonfiction, Picture Book Text, and Picture Book Illustration.

In March 1978, SCBWI announced it would offer work-in-progress grants in memory of illustrator and board member Don Freeman. Today, nearly $25,000 in Work-in-Progress grants are given annually to SCBWI members.

In 1991, illustrator and board member Tomie dePaola lobbied to officially include illustrators in organization. and the name was changed to the current: Society of Children's Book Writers and Illustrators.

In 1993, Sue Alexander opened the first office in West Hills, California.

In 1996, SCBWI launched its first website with the help of Bruce Balan.

In 1999, in Paris, France, SCBWI held its first conference outside the United States.
Also in 1999, in New York City, SCBWI added an annual Winter International Conference.

In 2010, SCBWI established the Crystal Kite Member's Choice Awards to recognize great children's literature in 15 regional divisions around the world.

Publications
The Bulletin:
The SCBWI Bulletin is a bi-monthly publication containing information about the field of children's literature. Features include marketing reports; articles on writing, illustrating, and publishing; contests and awards announcements; SCBWI member news; and ongoing SCBWI activities throughout the world.

The Book:
SCBWI also publishes The Book, which provides information and references to both published and unpublished writers and illustrators. Publications include specific information on publishers, agents, markets, educational programs, contracts, critique groups, and editorial services.

Awards and grants
The Society of Children's Book Writers and Illustrators presents several awards and grants to its members each year including:

Amber Brown Grant: Named in honor of the late author and SCBWI supporter,  Paula Danzinger, the Amber Brown Grants are given to underserved schools with the desire and commitment to enrich their curriculum with a visit from an author or illustrator.  SCBWI provides an all-expense-paid, full-day visit by a well-respected children's author or illustrator. The chosen school also receives a $250 stipend to assist in creating the event and $250 worth of books by the visiting author. One or two schools are chosen each year.

Book Launch Award: The SCBWI Book Launch Award provides two annual awards of $2000 each for an author or illustrator to use for marketing a book scheduled for release during the next calendar year. The money can be used for any kind of promotional purpose that will increase sales and visibility of the book, such as launch events, speaking engagements, book tours, curriculum materials, advertising, book trailers, website development, or community events.

Crystal Kite Member Choice Awards: Recognize great books from the 70 SCBWI regions around the world.  Along with the SCBWI Golden Kite Awards, the Crystal Kite Awards are chosen by other children's book writers and illustrators, making them the only peer-given awards in publishing for young readers. Each member of SCBWI is allowed to vote for their favorite book from a nominated author in their region that was published in the previous calendar year.

Golden Kite Award: Given annually to recognize excellence in children's literature in four categories: Fiction, Nonfiction, Picture Book Text, and Picture Book Illustration. Winning authors and illustrators receive an expenses-paid trip to Los Angeles to attend the award ceremony at the Golden Kite Luncheon at SCBWI's Summer Conference in August and a lifetime membership in SCBWI. A commemorative poster with the winners will be created and distributed to, among others, various schools, libraries and publishers.

Magazine Merit Award: The SCBWI Magazine Merit Awards are presented annually for original magazine work for young people. Each year, the SCBWI presents four plaques, one in each category of fiction, nonfiction, illustration, and poetry, each year to honor members' outstanding original magazine work published during that year. The works chosen are those that exhibit excellence in writing and illustration, and genuinely appeal to the interests and concerns of young people. Honor Certificates in each category are also awarded.

Member of the Year: Goes to a member who has given outstanding service to the organization.

Portfolio Award:  An award for best portfolio on display in the Juried Art Portfolio Display at the Annual SCBWI Summer Conference in Los Angeles. The winner of the Portfolio Award receives an expenses-paid trip to New York to meet with interested art directors.

Sid Fleischman Award: An award for exemplary writing for children in the genre of humor. Sid Fleischman was the inaugural recipient of the SCBWI Humor Award, for his extensive body of work, at the 32nd Annual SCBWI Conference in Los Angeles, in August 2003.

Student Illustrator Scholarship: Each year four college students studying illustration are selected to attend the Summer and Winter conferences on a full scholarship.

Sue Alexander Most Promising New Work Award: Given to the manuscript deemed most promising for publication at the Los Angeles Summer Conference. Critiquers nominate manuscripts during the Los Angeles conference. The winner receives an expenses-paid trip to New York to meet with interested editors.

Tomie dePaola Award: Given annually to an illustrator of promise chosen by Tomie himself. The award consists of a $1,000 gift certificate for art supplies, plus full tuition, transportation and accommodations to the New York Winter Conference.

Tribute Fund: The SCBWI Tribute Fund commemorates members of the children's book community, their lives and their work by funding scholarships to the SCBWI International Summer and Winter Conferences for the general membership.

Work-in-Progress Grants: The SCBWI Work-In-Progress Grants are designed to assist children's book writers in the completion of a specific project, and are underwritten by a grant from Amazon.com.

Board of advisors
As of 2020 the board is made up of a host of prominent names in the field of children's literature including:

Kathleen Ahrens, professor and author
Laurie Halse Anderson, author
Bonnie Bader, publisher
Tracy Barrett, author
Judy Blume, author
Peter Brown, author and illustrator
Priscilla Burris, illustrator
Dana Carey, author and illustrator
Christopher Cheng, author
Lesa Cline-Ransome, author
Bruce Coville, author
Pat Cummings, author, illustrator and professor
Matt de la Peña, author
Emma D. Dryden, author
Ellen Hopkins, poet and author
Arthur A. Levine, author and publisher of Levine Querido
Alvina Ling, publisher
Laurent Linn, art director at Simon & Schuster Books for Young Readers
Meg Medina, author
Linda Sue Park, author
Susan Patron, author and former public librarian
Jerry Pinkney, illustrator
Ruta Sepetys, author
Melissa Stewart, science writer
Patricia Wiles, author and SCBWI’s Director of Regional Team Management
Lisa Yee, author
Cecilia Yung, art director at Penguin Young Readers Group
Cheryl Zach, author
Paul O. Zelinsky, illustrator

Activities
The SCBWI sponsors two annual International Conferences on Writing and Illustrating for Children each year, the Summer Conference held in Los Angeles, and the Winter Conference held in New York City. In addition, regional chapters around the world host dozens of smaller conferences throughout the year, ranging from events geared toward professional writers and/or illustrators to events for people just entering the field. Events such as book clubs, book launch parties, book signings, critique groups, gallery shows, KidLit nights, open studio tours, sketch crawls, writer/illustrator retreats, and more occur around the world. Each of the approximately 80 regions is led by a volunteer Regional Advisor (RA) or two co-RAs. Larger regions may also have Assistant RAs and Illustrator Coordinators as well as an advisory committee.

Diversity Initiatives and Reorganization 
Coming under scrutiny during the "Me Too" movement, SCBWI had some shakeups in leadership positions.

On June 3rd, 2020 SCBWI Executive Director, Lin Oliver, announced that April Powers has joined the organization as its inaugural Chief Equity & Inclusion Officer.

On June 10th, 2021 SCBWI released a statement against anti-semintism as a response to the growing violence against Jews worldwide and the tension between Palestine and Israel. There was a call for a similar statement to be made denouncing Islamaphobia and April Powers declined to release a statement. Powers subsequently stepped down voluntarily on June 27th. In July, 2021 an open letter to the organizations leadership came out released by people in the children's book community that put focus on SCBWI's organizational structure, finances, and diversity efforts. This letter was published July 12th and garnered more than 900 signatures. Many prominent authors associated with SCBWI including Laurie Halse Anderson, Meg Medina, and Linda Sue Park stepped down from their advisory board and the entire Rocky Mountain Chapter regional team resigned. There were death threats online that followed directed towards SCBWI leadership.

On August 4th, 2021 the board of advisors authorized an outside company to do an audit to find ways to reorganize and expand SCBWI.

See also
List of children's classic books
List of children's literature authors
List of children's non-fiction writers
List of fairy tales
List of illustrators
List of publishers of children's books
List of translators of children's books

References

External links

American writers' organizations
Children's literature organizations
Writers' conferences
International professional associations
Charities based in California
Arts organizations established in 1971
1971 establishments in the United States